Andres Mähar (born on 2 February 1978 in Tartu) is an Estonian actor.

Mähar studied at Türi Secondary School and sang in the Türi Boys' Choir. In 1996, he enrolled at the Estonian Academy of Music and Theatre's performing arts department in Tallinn, studying acting under course supervisor Ingo Normet, graduating in 2000. 

From 2000 until 2006, and again since 2011, he been a contracted actor at the Vanemuine theatre in Tartu. From 2006 until 2011, he worked at the NO99 Theatre. Besides stage roles he has also acted on films and television series.

Selected filmography
 Lovesick (2003)
 Täna öösel me ei maga (2004) – second car thief
 August 1991 (2005) – Paul
 Kodu keset linna (2007) – Ervin
 Brigaad 3 (2008) – Andrei
 Detsembrikuumus (2008) – Mait
 Pangarööv (2009) – security guard
 Pihv (2009) – Riho
 Kalevipojad (2011) – Anti
 Kelgukoerad (2011) – Eero
 Polaarpoiss (2016) – policeman
 Mehetapja/Süütu/Vari (2017) – driver
 Võta või jäta (2018) – Sven
 Tõde ja õigus (2019) – Rava Kustas

References

Living people
1978 births
Estonian male stage actors
Estonian male film actors
Estonian male television actors
21st-century Estonian male actors
Estonian Academy of Music and Theatre alumni
Male actors from Tartu